Rauvolfia serpentina, the Indian snakeroot, devil pepper, or serpentine wood, is a species of flower in the milkweed family Apocynaceae. It is native to the Indian subcontinent and East Asia (from India to Indonesia).

Chemical composition
Rauvolfia serpentina contains dozens of alkaloids of the indole alkaloid family, including ajmaline, ajmalicine, reserpine, and serpentine, among others.

Research
Rauvolfia serpentina may be useful in treating excitable patients with hypertension.  According to a 2016 review by Canadian researchers, 4 different high-quality clinical trials on humans suggest that reserpine significantly reduces systolic blood pressure (SBP) compared to placebo. They concluded it may be as effective at reducing SBP as other front-line hypertensive drugs, but that more research is needed to determine a dose-specific safety profile. Rabbits fed a high-cholesterol diet who took reserpine for 6 weeks had their total cholesterol levels reduced by 42% and their heart rate decreased by 28%.

Potential adverse effects

R. serpentina may cause adverse effects by interacting with various prescription drugs or via interference with mechanisms of mental depression or peptic ulcer. The reserpine in R. serpentina is associated with diverse adverse effects, including vomiting, diarrhea, dizziness, headache, anxiety, or hypersensitivity reactions.

See also
 Reserpine
 List of herbs with known adverse effects

References

serpentina
Plants described in 1877
Plants used in traditional Chinese medicine
Flora of Asia
Plants used in Ayurveda